Ýmir Örn Gíslason (born 1 July 1997) is an Icelandic handball player for Rhein-Neckar Löwen and the Icelandic national team.

He participated at the 2018 European Men's Handball Championship.

References

External links

1997 births
Living people
Ymir Orn Gislason
Ymir Orn Gislason
Ymir Orn Gislason
Rhein-Neckar Löwen players